Kolo, Togo  is a village in the Assoli Prefecture in the Kara Region  of north-eastern Togo.

References

Populated places in Kara Region
Assoli Prefecture